James Maher may refer to:

 Jimmy Maher (born 1974), Australian cricketer
 Jimmy Maher (politician) (1888–1964), New Zealand politician of the National Party
 James P. Maher (1865–1946), U.S. Representative from New York
 James J. Maher, Catholic priest and president of Niagara University
 James Maher (hurler) (born 1995), Irish hurler for Kilkenny
 James Maher (cleric), Irish-born Roman Catholic priest
 Jimmy Maher (footballer) (1913–1977), Australian footballer
 Jimmy Maher (hurler), Irish hurler

See also
 Hugh James Maher (1910–2001), politician in Saskatchewan, Canada
 James Marr (disambiguation)